Aponogeton azureus is a species of plant in the Aponogetonaceae family.  It is endemic to Namibia. Its natural habitat is freshwater marshes. It is threatened by habitat loss.

Overview 
Aponogeton azureus is known only from the type locality. The species has been looked for since it was first collected in 1974, but has not been found again.) It is assessed as Data Deficient because it is taxonomically uncertain.

If A. azureus proves to be a valid species, it may be considered Critically Endangered as it is known only known from one pool in the Northwest of Namibia and pools in this area are known to be over-utilised and trampled by livestock.

References

Further reading 
 Clarke, N.V. and Klaassen, E.S. 2001. Water Plants of Namibia An Identification Manual.  Occasional Contributions 2, National Botanical Research Institute, Windhoek, Namibia.

Flora of Namibia
azureus
Data deficient plants
Freshwater plants
Taxonomy articles created by Polbot